An anesthetic vaporizer (American English) or anaesthetic vaporiser (British English) is a device generally attached to an anesthetic machine which delivers a given concentration of a volatile anesthetic agent. It works by controlling the vaporization of anesthetic agents from liquid, and then accurately controlling the concentration in which these are added to the fresh gas flow. The design of these devices takes account of varying: ambient temperature, fresh gas flow, and agent vapor pressure.

Modern vaporizers
There are generally two types of vaporizers: plenum and drawover. Both have distinct advantages and disadvantages. The dual-circuit gas-vapor blender is a third type of vaporizer used exclusively for the agent desflurane.

Plenum vaporizers
The plenum vaporizer is driven by positive pressure from the anesthetic machine, and is usually mounted on the machine. The performance of the vaporizer does not change regardless of whether the patient is breathing spontaneously or is mechanically ventilated. The internal resistance of the vaporizer is usually high, but because the supply pressure is constant the vaporizer can be accurately calibrated to deliver a precise concentration of volatile anesthetic vapor over a wide range of fresh gas flows. The plenum vaporizer is an elegant device which works reliably, without external power, for many hundreds of hours of continuous use, and requires very little maintenance.

The plenum vaporizer works by accurately splitting the incoming gas into two streams. One of these streams passes straight through the vaporizer in the bypass channel. The other is diverted into the vaporizing chamber. Gas in the vaporizing chamber becomes fully saturated with volatile anesthetic vapor. This gas is then mixed with the gas in the bypass channel before leaving the vaporizer.

A typical volatile agent, isoflurane, has a saturated vapor pressure of 32kPa (about 1/3 of an atmosphere). This means that the gas mixture leaving the vaporizing chamber has a partial pressure of isoflurane of 32kPa. At sea-level (atmospheric pressure is about 101kPa), this equates conveniently to a concentration of 32%. However, the output of the vaporizer is typically set at 1–2%, which means that only a very small proportion of the fresh gas needs to be diverted through the vaporizing chamber (this proportion is known as the splitting ratio). It can also be seen that a plenum vaporizer can only work one way round: if it is connected in reverse, much larger volumes of gas enter the vaporizing chamber, and therefore potentially toxic or lethal concentrations of vapor may be delivered. (Technically, although the dial of the vaporizer is calibrated in volume percent (e.g. 2%), what it actually delivers is a partial pressure of anesthetic agent (e.g. 2kPa)).

The performance of the plenum vaporizer depends extensively on the saturated vapor pressure of the volatile agent. This is unique to each agent, so it follows that each agent must only be used in its own specific vaporizer. Several safety systems, such as the Fraser-Sweatman system, have been devised so that filling a plenum vaporizer with the wrong agent is extremely difficult. A mixture of two agents in a vaporizer could result in unpredictable performance from the vaporizer.

Saturated vapor pressure for any one agent varies with temperature, and plenum vaporizers are designed to operate within a specific temperature range. They have several features designed to compensate for temperature changes (especially cooling by evaporation). They often have a metal jacket weighing about 5 kg, which equilibrates with the temperature in the room and provides a source of heat. In addition, the entrance to the vaporizing chamber is controlled by a bimetallic strip, which admits more gas to the chamber as it cools, to compensate for the loss of efficiency of evaporation.

The first temperature-compensated plenum vaporizer was the Cyprane 'FluoTEC' Halothane vaporizer, released onto the market shortly after Halothane was introduced into clinical practice in 1956.

Drawover vaporizers
The drawover vaporizer is driven by negative pressure developed by the patient, and must therefore have a low resistance to gas flow. Its performance depends on the minute volume of the patient: its output drops with increasing minute ventilation.

The design of the drawover vaporizer is much simpler: in general it is a simple glass reservoir mounted in the breathing attachment. Drawover vaporizers may be used with any liquid volatile agent (including older agents such as diethyl ether or chloroform, although it would be dangerous to use desflurane). Because the performance of the vaporizer is so variable, accurate calibration is impossible. However, many designs have a lever which adjusts the amount of fresh gas which enters the vaporizing chamber.

The drawover vaporizer may be mounted either way round, and may be used in circuits where re-breathing takes place, or inside the circle breathing attachment.

Drawover vaporizers typically have no temperature compensating features. With prolonged use, the liquid agent may cool to the point where condensation and even frost may form on the outside of the reservoir. This cooling impairs the efficiency of the vaporizer. One way of minimising this effect is to place the vaporizer in a bowl of water.

The relative inefficiency of the drawover vaporizer contributes to its safety. A more efficient design would produce too much anesthetic vapor. The output concentration from a drawover vaporizer may greatly exceed that produced by a plenum vaporizer, especially at low flows. For safest use, the concentration of anesthetic vapor in the breathing attachment should be continuously monitored.

Despite its drawbacks, the drawover vaporizer is cheap to manufacture and easy to use. In addition, its portable design means that it can be used in the field or in veterinary anesthesia.

Dual-circuit gas–vapor blender
The third category of vaporizer (the dual-circuit gas–vapor blender) was created specifically for the agent desflurane. Desflurane boils at 23.5 °C, which is very close to room temperature. This means that at normal operating temperatures, the saturated vapor pressure of desflurane changes greatly with only small fluctuations in temperature. This means that the features of a normal plenum vaporizer are not sufficient to ensure an accurate concentration of desflurane. Additionally, on a very warm day, all the desflurane would boil, and very high (potentially lethal) concentrations of desflurane might reach the patient.

A desflurane vaporizer (e.g. the TEC 6 produced by Datex-Ohmeda) is heated to 39C and pressurized to 200kPa (and therefore requires electrical power). It is mounted on the anesthetic machine in the same way as a plenum vaporizer, but its function is quite different. It evaporates a chamber containing desflurane using heat, and injects small amounts of pure desflurane vapor into the fresh gas flow. A transducer senses the fresh gas flow.

A warm-up period is required after switching on. The desflurane vaporizer will fail if mains power is lost. Alarms sound if the vaporizer is nearly empty. An electronic display indicates the level of desflurane in the vaporizer.

The expense and complexity of the desflurane vaporizer have contributed to the relative lack of popularity of desflurane, although in recent years it is gaining in popularity.

Historical vaporizers 

Historically, ether (the first volatile agent) was first used by John Snow's inhaler (1847) but was superseded by the use of chloroform (1848). Ether then slowly made a revival (1862–1872) with regular use via Curt Schimmelbusch's "mask", a narcosis mask for dripping liquid ether. Now obsolete, it was a mask constructed of wire, and covered with cloth.

Pressure and demand from dental surgeons for a more reliable method of administering ether helped modernize its delivery. In 1877, Clover invented an ether inhaler with a water jacket, and by the late 1899 alternatives to ether came to the fore, mainly due to the introduction of spinal anesthesia. Subsequently, this resulted in the decline of ether (1930–1956) use due to the introduction of cyclopropane, trichloroethylene, and halothane. By the 1980s, the anesthetic vaporizer had evolved considerably; subsequent modifications lead to a raft of additional safety features such as temperature compensation, a bimetallic strip, temperature-adjusted splitting ratio and anti-spill measures.

References

External links 

 Free resource which graphically explains the principles of anesthesia vaporizers on howequipmentworks.com
 Anesthetic machine: a presentation
 The Anesthesia Gas Machine by Michael P. Dosch
 
 
 Precision vaporisers on Anaesthesia.UK
 Operating Instructions & Maintenance Guidelines for Precision Vaporizers
 
 
 
 
 
 

Anesthetic equipment
History of anesthesia
Drug delivery devices
Dosage forms